Donald J. Hickman (born June 11, 1955) is a former American football offensive lineman in the National Football League for the Detroit Lions and the Washington Redskins.  He played college football at the University of Southern California. Donnie Joe also has a son, Justin Hickman who currently plays for the Indianapolis Colts after being signed from a stint in the CFL with the Hamilton Tigers.  His nephew James Brooks attends Northern Alabama and plays defensive end.

References

1955 births
Living people
People from Flagstaff, Arizona
American football offensive guards
USC Trojans football players
Detroit Lions players
Washington Redskins players